Caroline Vermalle (born 1973) is a French author whose work, written in French and English, ranges from historical novels to thrillers.

Early life and education
Vermalle was born in Picardy, France. She studied cinema at École supérieure d'études cinématographiques in Paris.

Career
Vermalle worked as a BBC documentary producer in London, England. While on maternity leave, she wrote her first novel, L’avant-dernière chance.  The book was published in French in 2009 and won the Prix Nouveau Talent in 2009  and Prix Chronos in 2011. It has been translated into German, Spanish, Chinese and English (as George's Grand Tour) and sold over 300,000 copies during its first five years in print.

With the success of this novel, Vermalle became a full-time writer, and has written several more books. She and her husband, South African architect Ryan von Ruben, wrote together a novel in English titled A Flower for the Queen.

In 2016 Vermalle lives in the Vendée department of France with her husband and son.

Bibliography
L’avant-dernière chance (novel), Calmann-Lévy, 2009; in English,Gallic Books, 2015, 
Nouvelles contemporaines (short stories), Livre de Poche Jeunesse, 2012
Sixtine (T.1) (thriller), Hachette/Blackmoon, 2013
La Fille du Déménageur (short stories), Hachette/Blackmoon, 2013
L’Île des beaux lendemains (novel), Belfond, 2013
Une collection de trésors minuscules, Belfond, 2014

Les amis du Paradis, 2015

References

External links 
 Caroline Vermalle's website
 Caroline Vermalle's Facebook fan page
 Caroline Vermalle's UK publisher page
 Caroline Vermalle's German publisher page

1973 births
Living people
21st-century French non-fiction writers
Writers from Hauts-de-France
21st-century French women writers